The Elliot–Harris–Miner House is an historic house located at 1406 Old Louisquisset Pike in Lincoln, Rhode Island.  It is a rambling three-section structure, whose main block is  stories tall with a cross-gable roof with bracketed eaves.  The oldest portion of the house, however, was at its rear: it was originally a -story Cape style structure built c. 1710, but this has been torn down and replaced by a garage with a cross-gable roof matching that of the main block.  These two sections are joined by a third section with a gable roof.  The rear section was believed to be the oldest surviving Cape in Lincoln.

The house was listed on the National Register of Historic Places on August 30, 1984.

See also
National Register of Historic Places listings in Providence County, Rhode Island

References

External links
 Archiplanet (contains satellite view)
 Images of Rhode Island (contains photo of house)

Houses completed in 1710
Houses on the National Register of Historic Places in Rhode Island
Houses in Lincoln, Rhode Island
National Register of Historic Places in Providence County, Rhode Island
1710 establishments in Rhode Island